Basavanagudi is a residential and commercial locality in the Indian city of Bangalore. It is located in South Bangalore, along the borders of Jayanagar. The name "Basavanagudi" refers to the Bull Temple, which contains a monolith statue of the Nandi Bull. The word Basava in Kannada means bull, and gudi means temple. Basavanagudi is one of the oldest and poshest areas of Bangalore. 4.6 km far from Bangalore City Railway Station and BMTC, and 38.7 km to Kempegowda International airport. The main commercial street of Basavanagudi is DVG Road, which is home to numerous retail businesses - several of them dating back to the 1920s and 1930s. Towards the middle of DVG Road is Gandhi Bazaar, known for its markets which sell fresh flowers, fruits, and vegetables. The neighbourhood includes several historic restaurants, notably Vidyarthi Bhavan, a vegetarian restaurant which was opened in 1943.

Parks 
 M. N. Krishna Rao Park
 Bugle Rock
 T. R. Shamanna Park
 Armugam Circle Park
 Dewan Madhav Rao Circle Park
 Ramakrishna Square
 Home School Circle
 Tagore Circle
 Nettakallappa Circle

Events 
 Kadlekai Parishe: Every year a two-day fair of peanuts is held near Dodda Ganeshana Gudi temple of Basavanagudi called Kadlekai Parishe, which translates to Groundnut Fair. Groundnuts are exhibited and sold during this event.
 Bengaluru Ganesha Utsava: An annual event is held on the grounds of Acharya Pathasala Public School or National College, Bangalore celebrating Ganesh Chaturthi festival for over 10 days. The evenings are studded with cultural programmes by artists from all over India.

Education

 The Indian Institute of World Culture, B P Wadia Road
 Gokhale Institute of Public Affairs
 B.M.S. College of Engineering
 National College, Basavanagudi
 Acharya Pathasala Public School
 National High School, KR Road, Basavanagudi
 Vijaya College, R.V. Road, Basavanagudi
 Mahila Seva Samaj, KR Road
 Sree Saraswathi Vidhya Mandir
 Bangalore High School
 Mahila Mandali Vidya Samsthe

Temples and religious places
 Dodda Ganeshana Gudi
 Ramakrishna Ashram/Math
 Sri Mallikarjuna Swamy Temple
 Kaaranji Anjaneya Swamy Temple
 Uttaradhi Mutt
 Sringeri Shankarmutt
 Hanumanthana gudda(Ramanjaneya Gudda Temple)
 Poornaprajna Vidyapeetha
 Magadi Karnikara Patha Shaale
 Sri Vyasaraja Mutt Sosale
 Raghavendra Swamy Brindavana
 Puthige Mutt
 Jamia Masjid Mohammedan Block
 Renukamba Temple, MN Krishna Rao Park
 Ayyappa Swamy Temple
 Jayatheertha Brindavana Sanidhana, PMK Road, Basavanagudi,

Notable residents
D. V. Gundappa — Kannada poet and writer; after whom the DVG Road is named
Mysore Suryanarayana Bhatta Puttanna — Author of Kannada literature 
Anil Kumble — Former Indian cricketer and cricket coach
Hosur Narasimhaiah — Physicist, educator and activist
K. S. Nissar Ahmed — Kannada poet and writer
Masti Venkatesha Iyengar — Kannada poet and writer
P. Lankesh — Kannada Journalist
Ananth Kumar — Indian political leader
Srinath — Kannada actor
Navaratna Rama Rao - Political leader, writer and administrator

References 

Neighbourhoods in Bangalore